In the area of modern algebra known as group theory, the Suzuki group Suz or Sz is a sporadic simple group of order
   213 · 37 · 52 · 7 · 11 · 13 = 448345497600
 ≈ 4.

History
It is not related to the Suzuki groups of Lie type. The Schur multiplier has order 6 and the outer automorphism group has order 2.

Complex Leech lattice
The 24-dimensional Leech lattice has a fixed-point-free automorphism of order 3. Identifying this with a complex cube root of 1 makes the Leech lattice into a 12 dimensional lattice over the Eisenstein integers, called the complex Leech lattice. The automorphism group of the complex Leech lattice is the universal cover 6 · Suz of the Suzuki group. This makes the group 6 · Suz · 2 into a maximal subgroup of Conway's group Co0 = 2 · Co1 of automorphisms of the Leech lattice, and shows that it has two complex irreducible representations of dimension 12.  The group 6 · Suz acting on the complex Leech lattice is analogous to the group 2 · Co1 acting on the Leech lattice.

Suzuki chain

 G2(2) = U(3, 3) · 2 has a rank 3 action on 36 = 1 + 14 + 21 points with point stabilizer PSL(3, 2) · 2
 J2 · 2 has a rank 3 action on 100 = 1 + 36 + 63 points with point stabilizer G2(2)
 G2(4) · 2 has a rank 3 action on 416 = 1 + 100 + 315 points with point stabilizer J2 · 2
 Suz · 2 has a rank 3 action on 1782 = 1 + 416 + 1365 points with point stabilizer G2(4) · 2

Maximal subgroups
 found the 17 conjugacy classes of maximal subgroups of Suz as follows:

References

 Conway, J. H.; Curtis, R. T.; Norton, S. P.; Parker, R. A.; and Wilson, R. A.: "Atlas of Finite Groups: Maximal Subgroups and Ordinary Characters for Simple Groups."  Oxford, England 1985.

External links
 MathWorld: Suzuki group
  Atlas of Finite Group Representations: Suzuki group

Sporadic groups